Star Trek: The Next Generation Narrator's Toolkit is a 1998 role-playing game supplement for Star Trek: The Next Generation Role-playing Game published by Last Unicorn Games.

Contents
Star Trek: The Next Generation Narrator's Toolkit is a supplement in which advice is given for gamemasters running campaigns.

Reception
Narrator's Toolkit was reviewed in the online second version of Pyramid which said "Within this tome are the most useful instructions on how to run a role playing game that I have ever seen set to paper. And it's also useful to anyone running a Star Trek: The Next Generation RPG session."

Reviews
Backstab #12

References

Role-playing game supplements introduced in 1998
Science fiction role-playing game supplements